Wind power in Ukraine is mostly in areas affected by the Russo-Ukrainian War. At the end of 2021 there was 1.7 gigawatts (GW) of wind power capacity. One GW was planned to be added in 2022, but the Russian invasion stalled development.

The coasts of the Black and Azov Seas, the mountainous regions of the Crimean peninsula (especially the north-eastern coast) and the Carpathians, Odessa, Kherson, Zaporozhye, Donetsk, Luhansk and Mykolaiv regions are the most suitable for the construction of wind power plants. The potential of Crimea alone is sufficient to produce more than 40 billion kWh electricity every year.

Ukraine has a rather high climatic potential of wind power, which provides productive work not only of autonomous power units, but also of powerful wind power plants. The interest in exploring the most promising places for using wind energy is growing, based on its climatic potential and indicators of its possible utilization. According to the Global wind energy council, about 40% of the areas are suitable for wind power generation. In the medium term, it is possible to develop about 5,000 MW of wind energy, that is, 20-30% of total electricity consumption in the country. In 1996, the government announced a strategy for the construction of 200 MW of wind power by 2010, but by the end of 2011, only 151 MW were put into operation.

By the end of 2017, 505 MW of wind power plants had been launched in Ukraine, with 138 MW remaining in the occupied territory of Donetsk and Luhansk regions, and another 87.8 MW left in occupied Crimea.

As of March 2019, 8 powerful wind farms were being built in Ukraine with a total capacity of almost 1 GW. This is Ovid Wind (Odesa Oblast) - 87 MW; Black Sea WPP (Mykolaiv Oblast) - 70 MW; Prymorska WPP (Zaporizhia Oblast) - 200 MW; Overyanivska (Kherson Oblast) - 70 MW; Kramatorska WPP (Donetsk Oblast) - 70 MW; Orlivska WPP (Zaporizhia Oblast) - 100 MW; WES Sivash (Kherson Oblast) - 250 MW; Dnipro-Bug WPP (Kherson Oblast) - 110 MW.

Capacity 
 225.8 MW of WPP in the occupied by Russia territory of the Crimea and Donetsk and Luhansk regions

List of wind farms

See also 
 Wind power by country
Solar power in Ukraine
Biofuel in Ukraine
Geothermal power in Ukraine
Hydroelectricity in Ukraine
 Renewable energy in Ukraine

References

Sources 
 NBT builds EUR 370 million large-scale wind farm in Ukraine
 Norway builds large-scale wind farm in Ukraine
 Ukraine’s most powerful wind turbines now produced 45 km away from the front line